Marxism is a method of socioeconomic analysis that analyzes class relations and societal conflict, that uses a materialist interpretation of historical development, and a dialectical view of social transformation.  Marxist methodology uses economic and sociopolitical inquiry and applies that to the critique and analysis of the development of capitalism and the role of class struggle in systemic economic change.

Marxist bibliography

See also 

 Marxists Internet Archive

References

External links 
 Marxists Internet Archive